Puli may refer to:


Places
Puli, Nantou, urban township in Nantou County, Taiwan
Pulí, Cundinamarca, municipality and town in Colombia
Puli Khumri, city in northern Afghanistan
Puli, ancient name of Luzhi, town in Jiangsu, China
Tashkurgan Town, Xinjiang, China, historically called Puli

Films
Puli (1985 film), 1985 Telugu film
Puli (2010 film), 2010 Telugu film
Puli (soundtrack)
Puli (2015 film), 2015 Tamil fantasy film

Other uses
Puli dog, breed of Hungarian herding and livestock guarding dog
Puli (car), microcar made in Hungary 
The PuLi Hotel and Spa, in Shanghai, China
Mr. Puli, pseudonym of Lu Guimeng, Tang dynasty poet

See also
Pulis, a surname